Ozan Yılmaz (born 1 February 1988) is a Turkish-German footballer who plays as a midfielder for TSV Marl-Hüls, where he also is the assistant manager.

References

External links
 Profile at DFB.de
 Profile at kicker.de
 Profile at TFF.org

1988 births
Living people
Turkish footballers
German footballers
German people of Turkish descent
Turkey youth international footballers
Association football midfielders
SG Wattenscheid 09 players
SC Fortuna Köln players
Schwarz-Weiß Essen players
SpVgg Erkenschwick players
TSV Marl-Hüls players
3. Liga players
Regionalliga players